Elisabeth Williams is an American art director, production designer and set decorator. She won three Primetime Emmy Awards and was nominated for three more in the category Outstanding Production Design.

Selected television 
 Fargo (2015; nominated)
 The Handmaid's Tale (2017; nominated)
 The Handmaid's Tale (2017; won)
 The Handmaid's Tale (2018; won)
 The Handmaid's Tale (2019; won)
 The Handmaid's Tale (2020; nominated)

References

External links 

Living people
Place of birth missing (living people)
Year of birth missing (living people)
American art directors
American production designers
American set decorators
Primetime Emmy Award winners